Stegersbach is a town in the district of Güssing in the Austrian state of Burgenland.

Population

International relations
Its twin town is Northampton, Pennsylvania.

References

Cities and towns in Güssing District
Spa towns in Austria